William J. Simmons (June 29, 1849 – October 30, 1890) was an ex-slave who became Simmons College of Kentucky's  second president (1880–1890) and for whom the school eventually was named. Simmons greatly developed Howard University's teacher training programs when he took over the school. In addition, he was a writer, journalist, and educator. In 1886  he became president of the American National Baptist Convention, one of the organizations that would merge to form the National Baptist Convention, USA. He was elected president of the Colored Press Association for his work as editor of the American Baptist, a newspaper in Louisville, Kentucky.

Biography
Rev. Dr. William J. Simmons was born a slave in Charleston, South Carolina, to Edward and Esther Simmons on June 29, 1849. While William was young, his Mother fled slavery with her three children, William and his two sisters Emeline and Anna. They initially landed in Philadelphia, PA, and was met by an uncle named Alexander Tardiff, who housed them, fed them and educated the children. Due to stemming pressures from slave traders, Tardiff relocated his extended family to Roxbury, Pennsylvania, Chester, PA, and ultimately settled down in Bordentown, New Jersey. Tardiff had received an education from the future Bishop Daniel Payne and undertook to give Simmons and his siblings an education on that basis. From 1862 to 1864 William served as an apprentice to a dentist. He served in the Union Army during the US Civil War, enlisting September 15, 1864 and serving a one-year term. He took part in the siege of Petersburg, the Battle of Hatcher's Run, and the Battle of Appomattox Court House and was present at the surrender of Confederate General Robert E. Lee. After the war, he returned to dentistry. In 1867, he converted to Baptist and joined a White Baptist church in Bordentown that was pastored by Reverend J. W. Custis. The congregation helped him through college. He attended Madison University (now Colgate University, graduated in 1868), Rochester University, and Howard University, from which he graduated with a bachelor's degree in 1873. As a student, he worked briefly in Washington D.C. at Hillsdale School. In Hillsdale, he boarded with Smithsonian Institution employee, Solomon G. Brown. After graduating he moved to Arkansas on the advice of Horace Greeley to become a teacher there, but returned to Hillsdale soon after where he taught until June 1874.

The following summer, he married Josephine A. Silence on August 25, 1874 and moved to Ocala, Florida. The couple had seven children, Josephine Lavinia, William Johnson, Maud Marie, Amanda Moss, Mary Beatrice, John Thomas, and Gussie Lewis. In Florida, he invested in land to grow oranges, became principal of Howard Academy's teacher training program and served as the pastor of a church, deputy county clerk and county commissioner. He campaigned for the Republican Rutherford B. Hayes. He served there until 1879. He was ordained that year and moved to Lexington, Kentucky where he pastored the First Baptist Church. The following year, he became the second president of the Kentucky Normal and Theological Institute, which he worked for a decade. The school was eventually renamed the State University of Louisville and later to Simmons College of Kentucky after Simmons due to schools progression under his tenure. He was succeeded in 1894 at Simmons College by Charles L. Purce.

In Kentucky he was elected for several years the chairman of the State Convention of Colored Men. On September 29, 1882, he was elected editor of the journal, the American Baptist where he criticized the failures of both political parties to support blacks in their civil rights and progress. He was also president of the American Baptist Company. in 1886 he was elected over T. Thomas Fortune to president of the Colored Press Association, having lost to W. A. Pledger the previous year. In 1883, Simmons organized the Baptist Women's Educational Convention, and in 1884, Blanche Bruce appointed Simmons commissioner for the state of Kentucky at the 1884 World's Fair in New Orleans. In 1886, he organized and was elected president of the American National Baptist Convention. The convention was a call for African American Baptist unity and was also led by Richard DeBaptiste and featured notable presentations by Solomon T. Clanton and James T. White. In 1889 in Indianapolis, Simmons was a leader at the American National Baptist Convention and wrote a resolution to provide aid for blacks fleeing violence in the South and moving to the North.

Simmons received an honorary master's degree from Howard University in 1881 and an honorary Doctorate degree from Wilberforce University in 1885. In 1887, he published a book entitled Men of Mark: Eminent, Progressive and Rising, which highlights the lives of 172 prominent African-American men, while serving as the school's president. He was working on a sister edition of the title that would highlight the lives and accomplishments of prominent pre-1900 African-American women, but unfortunately died before its completion. He died on October 30, 1890, in Louisville, Kentucky.

Bibliography

References

External links
Men of Mark: Eminent, Progressive and Rising. Cleveland, Ohio: Geo. M. Rewell, 1887.
Smith, Jessie Carney (editor). Notable Black American Men, Detroit, Michigan: Gale Research Incorporated, 1999, pp. 1066–1077.

Baptist writers
1849 births
1890 deaths
American educators
Writers from Louisville, Kentucky
Writers from Charleston, South Carolina
People of South Carolina in the American Civil War
African-American writers
African-American journalists
African-American educators
19th-century American journalists
American male journalists
Simmons College of Kentucky people
National Baptist Convention, USA ministers
19th-century American male writers
Baptists from Kentucky
New Jersey Republicans
Kentucky Republicans
19th-century American clergy